Eupithecia penablanca is a moth in the family Geometridae first described by Clifford D. Ferris in 2007. It is found in Carr Canyon in the US state of Arizona. The habitat consists of oak chaparral forests.

The length of the forewings is 7–8 mm for males and 7–9 mm for females. The forewings are pale gray brown. Adults have been recorded on wing in August.

Etymology
The species name refers to the type locality.

References

Moths described in 2007
penablanca
Moths of North America